Rowden is a surname. Notable people with the surname include:

Caleb Rowden (born 1982), American politician
Daniel Rowden (born 1997), British middle-distance runner
Diana Rowden, Special Operations Executive agent in World War II. Executed by the Germans. 
Mark Rowden (born in 1979), Australian printmaker
Walter Courtney Rowden, British screenwriter and film director
William H. Rowden (born 1930), United States Navy vice admiral